The qualifying tournament for the 1985 AFC U-16 Championship took place from 20 August to 21 September, 1984.

Groups

Group 1A

All matches were played in Doha, Qatar.

Group 1B
All matches were played in Riyadh, Saudi Arabia.

 and  withdrew.

Group 2A
All matches were played in Bangkok, Thailand.

Group 2B
As with Group 2A, all Group 2B matches were also played in Bangkok, Thailand.

 and  withdrew.

References

External links
 RSSSF

1985 AFC U-16 Championship
AFC U-16 Championship qualification